Glyphodes margaritaria is a moth in the family Crambidae. It was described by Carl Alexander Clerck in 1764. It is found in Indonesia (Ambon Island), New Guinea and northern Australia, including Queensland.

The wingspan is about 30 mm. There is a pattern of white, red and dark brown on the wings.

References

Moths described in 1764
Glyphodes
Taxa named by Carl Alexander Clerck